Triin Ojaste (born 14 March 1990) is an Estonian cross-country skier who has competed since 2007. At the 2010 Winter Olympics in Vancouver, she finished 16th in the team sprint and 37th in the individual sprint event. She also represented Estonia at the 2014 Winter Olympics.

Ojaste finished 16th in the 4 × 5 km relay and 37th in the individual sprint event at the FIS Nordic World Ski Championships 2009 in Liberec. Her best World Cup finish was 15th in a team sprint event at Germany in 2009 while her best individual finish was 23rd in an individual sprint event at Germany in 2009.

Her father and trainer is  biathlete Kalju Ojaste.

Cross-country skiing results
All results are sourced from the International Ski Federation (FIS).

Olympic Games

World Championships

World Cup

Season standings

References

External links

1990 births
Cross-country skiers at the 2010 Winter Olympics
Cross-country skiers at the 2014 Winter Olympics
Estonian female cross-country skiers
Living people
Olympic cross-country skiers of Estonia
Sportspeople from Rakvere
21st-century Estonian women